Marie of Valois (1309 – 23 October 1331), was the eldest daughter of Charles of Valois by his third wife Mahaut of Châtillon. She was a member of the House of Valois. One of her five children was Queen Joanna I of Naples.

Life 
Marie married Charles, Duke of Calabria, in 1323 when she was only fourteen years of age. Charles married her after the death of his first wife, Catherine of Habsburg, who had died without bearing Charles any children. Marie earned the gratitude of the genteel women in Florence when she persuaded her husband to allow them to wear what they could afford.

Charles and Marie had five children:

 Eloisa (b. January or February 1325 – d. 27 December 1325).
 Maria (b. April 1326 – d. 1328).
 Charles Martel (b. Florence, 13 April 1327 – d. Florence, 21 April 1327).
 Joanna (b. Naples, March 1328 – d. castello di San Fele, 22 May 1382), Queen of Naples after succeeding her grandfather.
 Maria (b. Naples, May 1329 – d. Naples, 20 May 1366), Countess of Alba.

Her eldest surviving daughter, Joanna, became Queen of Naples. Her youngest daughter, Maria, born six months after Charles' death, became the Countess of Alba.

Marie's husband died in 1328 and she never remarried. She died in 1331 at the age of 22, during a pilgrimage to Bari. Her mother and two sisters outlived her.

Ancestors

Notes

References
 

1309 births
1332 deaths
House of Valois
French princesses
Duchesses of Calabria
14th-century French people
14th-century French women
Joanna I of Naples